The Cynthiana Commercial District is a  historic district in Cynthiana, Kentucky which was listed on the National Register of Historic Places in 1982.  It included 67 contributing buildings.

It includes the core of Cynthiana's late 1800s commercial architecture, in two blocks of South Main Street from Bridge Street to Pleasant Street, and two blocks of East Pike Street from South Main Street to Church Street.

It includes the Harrison County Courthouse, which is separately listed on the National Register, and Cynthiana's City Hall.

References

Historic districts on the National Register of Historic Places in Kentucky
National Register of Historic Places in Harrison County, Kentucky
Victorian architecture in Kentucky
Buildings and structures completed in 1820
Commercial buildings on the National Register of Historic Places in Kentucky
Cynthiana, Kentucky